

Key Out of Time is a science fiction novel by American writer Andre Norton, set on the world, Hawaika, that appears to be a tropical paradise.

It is the fourth in Norton's series starts in The Time Traders, part of her Forerunner universe, and continues the series’ premise: A hostile encounter between Western heroes, and the Russian Communists, and the Baldies – a mysterious alien race that used time travel to alter Earth. In the previous novel, The Defiant Agents, events are treated as a Time Agent failure – but re-read that novel for a different interpretation.

Plot
In the present day, Time Agents Ross Murdock and Gordon Ashe come with settlers to the water-dominated planet, Hawaika, to search remains from the distant past of the alien Baldies. They are assisted by intelligent dolphins, with whom the humans can communicate. While setting up their time gate, a storm destroys it and strands them in widely separated locations in Hawaika's unknown past.

Murdock learns from a native named Loketh that Gordon is being held in a castle. Ross and Loketh are captured by seafaring Rovers, then join them. They liberate a Rover island that had been captured by the Baldies. Ross convinces a coalition of natives the Baldies are playing them against one another.

Murdock finds Ashe at last, in the company of the mystic and advanced Foanna, of whom there turns out to be only three – the last of their race. The Foanna set a trap for the Baldies, using their castle as bait, but with only three of them, they cannot win against the whole attacking force. Murdock and Ashe agree to a process that mentally joins them with the Foanna, and in a second encounter with the Baldies, they win.

In a final encounter, Murdock is teleported into a Baldy ship like the one familiar to him from Galactic Derelict, and sets its course to a random destination. The main Baldy installation is simultaneously attacked and the Baldies driven off the planet.

Reception
Kirkus Reviews, strongly supportive after following the series for years, writes

Publication history
Key out of Time was first published in 1963, and as of 2012, had been reprinted in 17 editions with cover changes, as well as twice in a combined edition with The Defiant Agents.

Novels in the series
 The Time Traders (1958)
 Galactic Derelict (1959)
 The Defiant Agents (1962)
 Key Out of Time (1963)
 Firehand (1994) (with Pauline M Griffin)
 Echoes in Time (1999) (with Sherwood Smith)
 Atlantis Endgame (2002) (with Sherwood Smith)

External links
 
  
 
 The novel in Open Library

1963 science fiction novels
1963 American novels
American science fiction novels
Novels about time travel
Novels by Andre Norton